Reginald John Godfrey Bateman, Master of Arts of Dublin (12 October 1883 – 3 September 1918) was a professor of English at the University of Saskatchewan and an army officer during World War I.

Bateman was born and educated in Ireland and, in 1909, he became one of the first four professors at the University of Saskatchewan in Saskatoon and its first professor of English.

Works
Reginald Bateman, Teacher and soldier: A memorial volume of selections from his lectures and other writings.  Saskatoon: University of Saskatchewan, 1922, xi, 147.

References

External links 
 
 Biography at the Dictionary of Canadian Biography Online

University of Saskatchewan alumni
Canadian people of Irish descent
1883 births
1918 deaths
Canadian Expeditionary Force officers
Canadian military personnel killed in World War I